James Wentworth Leigh (22 January 1838 – 5 January 1923) was an Anglican priest in the last decade of the 19th century and the first two of the 20th. He was a very active Freemason, an enthusiastic temperance campaigner, and an ardent social reformer.

Early life
Born at Paris and brought up at Stoneleigh Abbey, Warwickshire in a noble family (his father was Chandos Leigh, 1st Baron Leigh from 1839), he was educated at Harrow and Trinity College, Cambridge.

At the age of sixteen he attempted to enlist in the British Army to serve in the Crimean War and after leaving university went on a tour with three friends of Egypt, Palestine and Constantinople before studying for ministry in the Church of England at Wells Theological College.

Career
He was ordained in 1862  and became Curate of St John the Baptist, Bromsgrove. Two years later he was appointed Vicar of Stoneleigh, Warwickshire. Later he held incumbencies at All Saints Leamington and St Mary's, Bryanston Square.  In 1894 he was appointed to the Deanery of Hereford Cathedral and retired in 1919.

Freemasonry
He was an active and zealous Freemason, who rose to very senior rank within the organisation. Having risen through the ranks of his lodge, and his Provincial Grand Lodge, and attained appointment as an officer of the United Grand Lodge of England, in 1899 he was granted the honorary rank of Past Grand Chaplain, the most senior clerical appointment in Freemasonry. In 1906 he received a patent to act as Provincial Grand Master of Herefordshire, taking sole charge of all lodges in that county.

Personal life
He died in January 1923 aged 84.

Notes

External links 
 St Johns Church Bromsgrove

1838 births
1923 deaths
People educated at Harrow School
Alumni of Trinity College, Cambridge
19th-century English Anglican priests
20th-century English Anglican priests
Church of England deans
Deans of Hereford
Younger sons of barons
English cricketers
Gentlemen of Marylebone Cricket Club cricketers